HD 90156 is a 7th magnitude G-type main sequence star located approximately 73 light years away in the constellation Hydra. This star is smaller, cooler, fainter, and less massive than the Sun. Also its metal content is over half as much as the Sun. In 2009, a gas giant planet was found in orbit around the star.

This star was designated as Gamma Antliae by Lacaille, and Gould intended to keep it in that constellation. However, the delineating of constellation boundaries in 1930 saw it transferred to Hydra.

The survey in 2015 have ruled out the existence of any stellar companions at projected distances above 5 astronomical units.

Planetary system

See also 
 List of extrasolar planets

References 

G-type main-sequence stars
090156
050921
Hydra (constellation)
Planetary systems with one confirmed planet
Durchmusterung objects
3597